Glen Murray is a rural community in the Waikato District and Waikato region of New Zealand's North Island, on Highway 22, about  up the Tikotiko Stream from Lake Whangape. In 2013 the population of meshblock 0846601, which includes Glen Murray, was 42. It has a garage and a War Memorial Hall, which opened in 1952. It is named after William Murray, who moved from Piako in 1885.

Te Poho o Tanikena Marae is the meeting place of the local Waikato Tainui hapū of Ngāti Tāhinga, Ngāti Taratikitiki and Tainui Hapū. It includes a meeting house of the same name.

History 
Glen Murray was settled by Ngāti Tipa. In 1864 the area was described as inaccessible to the British troops in the Invasion of the Waikato, due to the swamps and bush.

However, by 1866 it was in the confiscated area. By 1868 large parcels of land had been surveyed. As part of a policy of opening up land for settlement under the deferred payment scheme, the Government built bridleways from the Waikato River, to give access to two  blocks. By 1881,  had been opened as far as Glen Murray, through heavy swamp at the Churchill end. By 1883 a through track from the Waikato River to the West Coast was in existence.

In 1881 a road was constructed from Churchill west to Glen Murray, and in 1882 a road south from Glen Murray towards Naike was surveyed. In 1893 a post office opened, with a telephone from 1905.

Whangape Lake and neighbouring streams were used for transport, a Whangape Launch Company being set up in 1906 to convey goods from Rangiriri. Earlier, in 1894, Parliament had been asked to "have obstructions in the shape of eel weirs removed from the navigable creeks flowing from Whangape Lake into the Waikato River, so as to enable steamers now running on the Waikato River to carry goods for settlers in that district." In 1889 the weir had been partly removed to allow a boat to get through.

Bothwell Sawmill was selling totara, rimu, kahikatea and matai in 1912.

School 
In 1893 a temporary school opened. By April 1896 a schoolhouse was nearing completion. It closed in February 2002.

References

Waikato District
Populated places in Waikato